Alexander Robert Douglas was a Scottish amateur footballer who played as a left half in the Scottish League for Queen's Park and Leith Athletic. He later managed Leith Athletic.

Personal life 
Allan served as a private in the Highland Light Infantry during the First World War.

Career statistics

References 

Scottish footballers
Queen's Park F.C. players
Year of death missing
British Army personnel of World War I
1893 births
Footballers from Perth, Scotland
Highland Light Infantry soldiers
Scottish Football League players
Scottish football managers
Leith Athletic F.C. managers
Scottish Football League managers
Association football wing halves